My Better Half (Traditional Chinese: 老公萬歲) is a 2010 TVB modern comedy series.

Synopsis
Pharmaceutical company employee Ching Sum (Michael Miu) has an overbearing wife, Ko Lai Sum (Maggie Cheung). In order not to fight head-on with her, he has been playing ostrich in their seven years of marriage.

Lai Sum, however, has never stopped watching his every move, as she always believes he is fooling around behind her back. Sum’s younger brother, Ching Yee (Michael Tse), laughs at Sum a lot, but he also feels sorry for his plight, and gives him practical advice whenever he can. One day, Sum is caught red-handed in Shenzhen by Lai Sum, who proposes to divorce him!

Yee always claims he has never lost in the game of love, until he meets Miu Ling Chi, a newly recruited management staff of the company. Yee loses bitterly this time, and almost loses his job, too.

Cast

Ching family

Other cast

Viewership ratings

References

External links
TVB.com My Better Half - Official Website 

TVB dramas
2010 Hong Kong television series debuts
2010 Hong Kong television series endings